Alessandro Ardente (died 1595) was an Italian painter during the late-Renaissance period. He was born in Faenza and active in Turin, Lombardy, and Lucca where he was well known as a portrait style. He painted a Conversion of St. Paul for the church of Monte della Pieta in Turin. He painted a Baptism of Christ for the church of San Giovanni and a St. Anthony Abbot (1565) for the church of San Paolino in Lucca .

References

1595 deaths
People from Faenza
16th-century Italian painters
Italian male painters
Painters from Piedmont
Italian Mannerist painters
Year of birth unknown